Raquel Morell (Spanish pronunciation: [rakel moɾeʎ] born Raquel del Rosario Ruiz Morell on February 4, 1959) is a Mexican actress who appeared in many telenovelas.

Morell was born in Morelia, Michoacán. She is probably best known for her role of Blanca De Velasco de Peñarreal in telenovela Esmeralda. Blanca was the mother of Esmeralda, who was played by Leticia Calderón. In Mi segunda madre she played a woman called like her in real life – Raquel. She appeared as herself in Contrato con la muerte.

She appeared in De que te quiero, te quiero. Morell, named after her mother Rosario Morell, married cinematographer Fernando Nesme; they are childfree. She is quite interested in astrology. Morell's younger brother is called Mario Ruiz Morell.

Filmography

Awards and nominations

References

External links

Raquel Morell's Facebook account

1960 births
Living people
Mexican telenovela actresses
Mexican television actresses
Mexican film actresses
20th-century Mexican actresses
21st-century Mexican actresses
Actresses from Michoacán
People from Morelia